The 1st arrondissement of Marseille is one of the 16 arrondissements of Marseille. It is governed locally together with the 7th arrondissement, with which it forms the 1st sector of Marseille.

 Population of neighbourhoods of the 1st arrondissement of Marseille

 Unemployment rate, as of 8/3/1999

 Dwellings in areas as of 8/3/1999

 Population of neighbourhoods by age 8/3/1999

References

External links
 Official website
 Dossier complet, INSEE

 
01